Placerville (formerly Old Dry Diggings, Dry Diggings, and Hangtown) is a city in and the county seat of El Dorado County, California. The population was 10,747 as of the 2020 census, up from 10,389 as of the 2010 census. It is part of the Sacramento–Arden-Arcade–Roseville Metropolitan Statistical Area.

History 
A former Maidu settlement called Indak was located at the site of the town.

After the discovery of gold at Sutter's Mill in nearby Coloma, California, by James W. Marshall in 1848 sparked the California Gold Rush, the small town now known as Placerville was known as Dry Diggin's after the manner in which the miners moved cartloads of dry soil to run water to separate the gold from the soil.

Later in 1849, the town earned its most common historical name, "Hangtown", because of the numerous hangings that had occurred there. However, there is debate on exactly how many lynchings occurred in the town. The town had no police force (in 1849) and five immigrants attempted robbery of a Mexican gambler. Of the five immigrants, two Frenchmen and one Chilean were known wanted men, and they were not given any trial, instead they were hanged on an oak tree on Main Street by a mob. The name "Hangtown" stuck after that event.

By about 1850, the temperance league and a few local churches had begun to request that a more friendly name be bestowed upon the town. The name was not changed until 1854 when the City of Placerville was incorporated, taking the name from the local placer gold deposits. At its incorporation, Placerville was the third largest town in California. In 1857, the county seat was then moved from Coloma to Placerville, where it remains today. The town's first post office opened in 1850. In 1871, the Placerville Union Cemetery was founded by a group of fraternal organizations, and it holds the graves of many of the city founders.

Placerville was a central hub for the Mother Lode region's mining operations. The town had many services, including transportation (of people and goods), lodging, banking, and had a market and general store.  The history of hard-rock mining is evidenced by an open and accessible Gold Bug Park & Mine, now a museum with tours and books.

The Southern Pacific Railroad once had a branch line that extended from Sacramento to Placerville.  The track was abandoned in the 1980s. The Camino, Placerville and Lake Tahoe Railroad (now abandoned) also operated an  shortline that operated between Camino, California, and Placerville until June 17, 1986. The track right-of-way is now a 37-mile hiking and biking path that connects the city of Folsom, California to the town of Camino with plans to extend the trail across the entire El Dorado county and eventually to Lake Tahoe.

Placerville is now registered as California Historical Landmark #701.

Placerville's logo featured a hangman's noose, in reference to the town's history as "Hangtown," until 2021, when the town council voted to remove it. An earlier proposal to redesign the logo had been rejected in 2020.

National Register of Historic Places gallery
Placerville has several buildings listed on the National Register of Historic Places; several are noted below.

Geography
Placerville is located in the Sierra Nevada foothills where U.S. Route 50 crosses State Route 49. It is the location of three traffic signals along U.S. Route 50, which is otherwise a freeway.

Climate
Placerville has cool, frequently wet winters and hot, dry summers, creating a typically Californian Mediterranean climate (Köppen Csa).

There are an average of 66 days with measurable rain. Although snowfall is rare in Placerville, heavy amounts often fall in the mountains east of the city.

Demographics

The 2010 United States Census reported that Placerville had a population of 10,389. The racial makeup of Placerville was 8,716 (83.9%) White, 80 (0.8%) African American, 162 (1.6%) Native American, 98 (0.9%) Asian, 13 (0.1%) Pacific Islander, 867 (8.3%) from other races, and 453 (4.4%) from two or more races. Hispanic or Latino of any race were 1,863 persons (17.9%).

The Census reported that 9,788 people (94.2% of the population) lived in households, 131 (1.3%) lived in non-institutionalized group quarters, and 470 (4.5%) were institutionalized.

There were 4,129 households, out of which 1,254 (30.4%) had children under the age of 18 living in them, 1,607 (38.9%) were opposite-sex married couples living together, 604 (14.6%) had a female householder with no husband present, 250 (6.1%) had a male householder with no wife present.  There were 327 (7.9%) unmarried opposite-sex partnerships, and 31 (0.8%) same-sex married couples or partnerships. 1,306 households (31.6%) were made up of individuals, and 599 (14.5%) had someone living alone who was 65 years of age or older. The average household size was 2.37.  There were 2,461 families (59.6% of all households); the average family size was 2.97.

The population was spread out, with 2,277 people (21.9%) under the age of 18, 972 people (9.4%) aged 18 to 24, 2,468 people (23.8%) aged 25 to 44, 2,831 people (27.2%) aged 45 to 64, and 1,841 people (17.7%) who were 65 years of age or older.  The median age was 40.4 years. For every 100 females, there were 90.3 males.  For every 100 females age 18 and over, there were 86.9 males.

The homeowner vacancy rate was 3.5%; the rental vacancy rate was 7.8%.  5,023 people (48.3% of the population) lived in owner-occupied housing units and 4,765 people (45.9%) lived in rental housing units.

Government

Economy
The region east of Placerville, popularly known as Apple Hill and Pleasant Valley, is becoming a center for wine production. The wine region is officially designated as the El Dorado AVA. The largest wineries in the area are Boeger, Lava Cap and Madrona, but most of the 30 plus wineries surrounding Placerville are family owned and smaller in wine grape and wine production. The region is "renown[ed] for making vibrantly flavorful, distinctly delicious wines, grown in the dramatic elevations of the Sierra Nevada." The area is increasingly a center for sophisticated production of Rhone style wines, noted by El Dorado County having a local chapter of the Rhone Rangers winemaker association.

Formerly known as Anderson Field, the arena and main grandstand that is now known as Placerville Speedway was originally built by the El Dorado County Fair during the winter months of 1956. Constructing a clay racing surface around the perimeter of the football field, Warren Jewitt and Bruno Romani created what was originally known as "Hangtown Speedway". Auto racing took place here for the first time on June 18, 1965.

Since 1965, Placerville Speedway has hosted several racing divisions. The track was cut out of a hillside, giving it higher banking, and covered with a dark red clay racing surface.

Placerville is home to the Mountain Democrat, the oldest continuously published newspaper in California, and Marshall Medical Center.

Transportation

Placerville is served by two major highways. California State Route 49 runs north and south, connecting the city with the other major communities in the Sierra Nevada foothills. U.S. Route 50 heads west to Sacramento and east to South Lake Tahoe.   This portion of U.S. Route 50 is a part of the Lincoln Highway.

El Dorado Transit runs public bus service, both local routes connecting Placerville to other populated areas on the western slope and weekday commuter service to/from Sacramento. Amtrak's thruway bus service stops in Placerville along its route connecting Sacramento and South Lake Tahoe.

Placerville is served by the Placerville Airport. A "Good Neighbor" airport (one that takes measures for noise abatement), it has a  runway, but is not currently served by any commercial air transport.

Culture

Placerville has many old buildings from the Gold Rush days.  A walk down Main Street also reveals many historical markers, signifying spots of certain events or persons of importance during this period.  Placerville was also on the line of the Pony Express, a short-lived mail carrier service that connected California to the Midwest and East (basically from Sacramento to St. Joseph, Missouri).

Historically, Placerville was often referred to by the name "Hangtown," because of the 3 unfortunates that were hung after being caught for cattle rustling by locals. Those traveling in the area can still see the site of the hangman's platform that was used for public hangings along with a commemorative mannequin ("George") hanging from a noose above the Old Hangman's Tree (now an ice cream parlor).  The dummy enjoyed a brief hiatus when town officials attempted to freshen up the town's image before returning due to popular demand.  In 2015 the dummy was stolen. It has since been replaced. In April 2021, the city council agreed unanimously to remove the noose from the city's logo.

Placerville is home to the legendary dish known as the "Hangtown fry" which includes eggs, bacon, and oysters. There are multiple legends regarding the origin, but all stories agree that Placerville is the place of origin.

The Southern Pacific Transportation Company branch line was purchased from the Union Pacific in 1996 for $14 million by the Joint Powers Authority consisting of Sacramento County, Folsom, and El Dorado County. The line is being converted to a hiking and biking trail, with over 12 miles of the rail line now paved as a Class 1 biking route.

Placerville is the home of United Ancient Order of Druids of California Grove No. 1, which was established in 1860 as the first Druid hall in  California. It was reinstated in 2017–18, along with several other historical fraternal societies.  Main Street Placerville features a large stone column holding a glass and metal "torch" known as "The Druid Monument", commemorating the Order's inception there 1860.  The City of Placerville is currently attempting to repave the roundabout containing the monument, possibly removing it permanently in the process—a proposal that has divided the community.

Notable people

Over the years many influential people had shops in Placerville, mostly along the now historic Main Street.

Gallery

See also
 Community Observatory
 Placerville Mountain Democrat

References

Sources

External links

 
 The Mountain Democrat (local newspaper)
 Placerville Downtown Association

 
Cities in El Dorado County, California
County seats in California
Cities in Sacramento metropolitan area
Incorporated cities and towns in California
Mining communities of the California Gold Rush
California Gold Rush
Pony Express stations
U.S. Route 50
California Historical Landmarks
Populated places established in 1848
Populated places established in 1854
1854 establishments in California